Kim Su-ji may refer to:

 Kim Su-ji (volleyball) (born 1987)
 Kim Su-ji (curler) (born 1993)
 Kim Su-ji (diver) (born 1998)